V. Balan (17 October 1942  – 22 January 2002), popularly known as Artist V. Balan, was a sculptor and painter from India. He was born the son of Chellamma and Venketachelam Pillai in the small temple town of Perumbavoor, Kerala. In 1962 he earned a Diploma from the Cochin School of Art. Immediately after his studies, he started teaching at the same school. In 1970 he moved to Chennai as a freelance artist.

At Chennai, he did his first ever Mosaic Art of the Risen Lord for a chapel of Salesian Provincialate. From 1972 onwards, he started designing the interiors of churches throughout India and acquired fame as an artist and architect of Christian places of worship.

Ten years later he moved to Bangalore and established his studio, Arte Sacra, near the National Biblical, Catechetical and Liturgical Centre.

Introduction to Christian art

For 15 years until 1982 Balan lived in Madras. His talents were versatile, varying from canvas to mosaic, from metal to wood and from sculpture to architecture. He executed Christian works in different parts of the country from the North – Rishikesh in the Himalayas – to the south and even to Sri Lanka. In Sri Lanka, he renovated the interior of St. Mary's Church at Negombo. He was the chief designer of the interior and the façade of the Stella Maris Cathedral in Port Blair, Andaman Islands. He later did more than 300 works related to churches and religious institutions during his tenure in Madras.

The artist on the move
In 1983 Balan moved from Madras to Kothanur, a peaceful village in the suburbs of Bangalore, where he built his studio, Tapovan. Many disciples attended the training centre, which was set up along with the studio for young artists in simple Gurukula style – Kalakshetra.

Multifaceted talent

Balan was very passionate in painting right through his career. Though Balan is often identified with his characteristic mosaic art, his sculptures reveal his profound artistic talent more than any other medium. "The queen of the apostles" is a unique presentation of the theme at the Shrine of St. Vincent Pallotti, Bangalore. The visualization of "The song of creation" of Francis of Assisi is a relief sculpture with copper finish.

The gigantic relief sculpture measuring 125×42 in the Sanctuary of the St. Vincent Pallotti's Shrine, Banasawadi, Bangalore depicts salvation history from creation to the resurrection as a background to the 45' high resurrection figure and the Christian Community gathered in worship. The sculptor in Balan is clearly seen in the peculiar forms and shapes of altars and tabernacles he has given shape in wood, stone and metal in different churches.

Balan also works in the medium of metal. The peculiar metallic figures and images cast in his studio are a manifestation of his multifaceted talent. Traditional stained glass was another favorite medium of Balan.

The architectural talent in Balan was a natural extension of the artist in him. His clear and detailed drawings for churches are proof of that architectural mettle and precision. He designed and executed many churches in India and abroad.

The silent man
Balan kept away from the limelight and media. He never put a signature on his paintings, mosaics or murals. He was little known as a person and loved his anonymity. He never satisfied with any of his works and always thought it could have been done better.

List of works

 Saint Mary's Co-Cathedral – George Town, Madras City
 Saint Mary's School – Madras City
 Don Bosco Shrine – Madras City
 Don Bosco School – Perambur, Madras City
 Don Bosco School Chapel – Egmore, Madras City
 Diocesan Pastoral Centre – Mylapore, Madras City
 Kings Fort Convent – Salesian Sisters – Kilpauk, Madras
 Saint Anne's Generalate Chapel – Madhavaram
 Saint Anne's Novitiate – Madras City
 Saint Anne's Chapel – Madras City
 Saint Anne's Mother House – Madras City
 Pope John's Garden Chapel – Madras
 Beatitudes Prayer Room – Madras City
 Salesian Institute of Graphic Arts – Madras City
 Parish Church – Meenambakkam
 Franciscan Sisters' Chapel – Poonamalee, Madras
 St. Joseph's Technical Institute Basin Bridge – Madras
 Don Bosco Youth Centre Basin Bridge – Madras
 Our Lady's Church – Madras
 Lakshmi Theatre – Pallavaram, Madras
 Jyothi Theatre St. Thomas Mount – Madras
 Hotel Palm Grouve – Madras
 Hotel Gokulam – Madras City
 Central Health Centre – Madras
 Franciscan Friary
 Salesian Provincial House. Madras
 Parish Church, Porur
 Bon Succour Convent Chapel. Mylapore
 Bon Succour Convent Chapel, Pallavaram
 Fatima Church. Madras
 Sacred Heart Seminary, Poonamalley
 Golden Jubilee Facade Madras
 Sacred Heart Seminary Chapel, Madras
 St. Isabella Hospital Chapel, Mylapore
 Stella Matutina College, Ashok Nagar, Madras
 Parish Church, Mahalakshmi Nagar, Madras
 St. Joseph's Church, Chengalpet – Tamil Nadu
 Leena Theatre, Chidambaram – Tamil Nadu
 Sahayamatha Hospital – Trichy
 Rosarian Ashram, Manapara, Trichy
 Sacred Heart Brothers Chapel, Trichy
 St. Joseph's Church – Jnanolipuram, Madurai
 Parish Church, Red Hill
 Don Bosco, K. Pudur, Madurai
 Don Bosco School Chapel – Varandarajanpet, Tamil Nadu
 Salesian Aspirantate – Tanjore, Tamil Nadu
 R.C. Church, Tiruvannamalai
 Don Bosco Church – Gandhi Nagar, Vellore
 Hotel Ranga – Vellore, Tamil Nadu
 St. Joseph Katpadi – Tamil Nadu
 Snehadeepam, Vellore,
 Parish Church, Madurapakkam, Tamil Nadu
 Don Bosco, Chengalpattu (Chingleput), Tamil Nadu
 Our Lady of Good Voyage, Cheyur, Tamil Nadu
 Don Bosco, Chingalpet, Tamil Nadu
 Parish Church, Adilakshmi Nagar, Tamil Nadu
 S.H. Church, Arakonam
 Mount Don Bosco, Kotagiri, Nilgiri
 Don Bosco School Chapel – Pannur, Tamil Nadu
 Don Bosco Chapel – Tiruppattur, Tamil Nadu
 St. Charles Sisters Chapel – Tirrupattur, Tamil Nadu
 Hotel Gokulam – Salem, Tamil Nadu
 Sacred Heart College Shrine – Tirrupattur, Tamil Nadu
 Cathedral – Salem
 The Retreat, Salesian College – Yercaud, Tamil Nadu
 The Retreat Auditorium – Yercaud
 Sakti Sugars, Administrative Building – Coimbatore, Tamil Nadu
 Hotel Shona – Coimbatore, Tamil Nadu
 Salesian Novitiate – Kottagiri, Tamil Nadu
 Saint Michael's Church – Guntur, Andhra Pradesh
 Prayer Hall, Don Bosco – Guntur
 Holy Cross Convent Chapel – Guntur
 Auxilium Salesian Sisters Chapel – Guntur
 The Risen Lord Church – Dhubadu, Andhra Pradesh
 Nirmala Nikethan – Regional Superior House Chapel, Vijayawada
 Saint Anne's Generalate Chapel – Vijayawada
 Urvasi Theatre – Vijayawada
 Don Bosco Mission – Convent Chapel – Ravulapalem, Andhra Pradesh
 Don Bosco – Ravulapalem
 Airport Terminal – Tirupati, Andhra Pradesh
 Raja Picture Palace – Vaisag, Andhra Pradesh
 Saint Antony's Church – Cuddapah, Andhra Pradesh
 Saint Teresa's Church – Hyderabad, Andhra Pradesh
 Santhi Nilayam – Hyderabad
 Saint Anne's Convent Chapel – Hyderabad
 Salesian Philosophate – Kondadaba, A.P.
 St. Peter's Cathedral – Gnanapuram
 Infant Jesus Church – Seefham Dhara. Vaisakh
 Carmelites Cloistered, Dakshinagiri
 Nalgonda Cathedral – Andhra Pradesh
 St. Teresa's Convent Chapel – Hyderabad
 Salesian Provincialate – Hyderabad
 Don Bosco School Chapel – Hyderabad
 St. Anne's Chapel – Hyderabad'
 Parish Church – Secunderabad
 St Anne's of Loressame – Regional House, Vijayawada
 Don Bosco – Vijayawada
 Pallottine House Chapel – Vijayawada
 Assumption Church – Vijayawada
 Don Bosco Provincial House – Mangalagiri
 St. Michael Orphanage Chapel – Cumur
 Don Bosco, – Warangal
 Salesian Sisters Chapel, Gumlur
 Jmj Provincialate – Gumlur
 St. Antony's Church – Gumlur
 St. Joseph's College – Gumlur
 Jmj College Chapel – Ternali
 St. Anne's Generalate – Gumlur
 St. Anne's School – Gumlur
 St. Anne's Convent – Gumlur
 Parish Church – Narasimharaopel
 St Charles' Sisters – A.P
 Don Bosco House – Ponnur. A.P.
 The Bishop House – A.P.
 Salesian College – Karunapuram, Warangal
 Don Bosco Youth Centre Chapel – Pune, Maharashtra
 Don Bosco Aspirantate Chapel – Lonavla, Maharashtra
 Dominic Savio's Chapel – andheri, Bombay
 Saint Joseph's Chapel – Kurla, Bombay
 Don Bosco – Nasik, Novitate
 The Risen Lord Chapel, Salesian Novitiate – Nasik, Maharashtra
 Palloiti Bhavan, Regional Superior House Chapel – Nagpur
 Bharathmata Ashram – Kurukshetra, Haryana
 Don Bosco – Pune
 Tabor Ashram – Kalyan, Maharashtra
 Pallotti Bhavan Seminary Hills – Nagpur
 Cmi House – Pune
 Kohima Cathedral, Nagaland
 Pune Cathedral, Pune
 Csst Generalate, Bangalore
 St. Anne's Provincial House, Bangalore
 Capuchin Provincial House, Bangalore
 Jmj Provincial House, Bangalore
 Dharmaram College – Bangalore. Karnataka
 Don Bosco Salesian Provincial House Bangalore
 St. Anne's Novitiate – Krishnarajapuram, Bangalore
 Salesian Sisters Novitiate – Avalahalli, Bangalore
 Saint Joseph The Leon's Novitiate, Bangalore
 Saint Joseph's Cathedral – Chikmagalur, Karnataka
 Saint Antony's Cathedral – Bellary, Karnataka
 Suvidya College Msfs, bangalore
 St. Francis De Sules Church, Bangalore
 St. John Medical College, Bangalore
 Adoration Sisters of Holy Spirit, Carmelaram
 A V P Carmelaram
 Carmel Theological Centre, Carmelaram
 Christ King School, Bangalore
 St. Casper Bhavan, Dharmaram, Bangalore
 Dharmaram Faculty of Theology, Bangalore
 Yuvaprajothiny, Bangalore
 Holy Cross Fathers Novitiate, Bangalore
 Pavithratma, Study Centre, Holy Spirit Sisters, Bangalore
 Pious Disciples of Divine Mater, St. Mark Rd. Bangalore
 Viswadeep, Catechetical Centre, Bangalore
 Salesian Sisters Novitiate, Bangalore
 Christu Jyothi, Bangalore
 Batram Fathers, Bangalore
 Teresian Carmelites Ctc, Bangalore
 Prima Mandira Canossian Sisters Provincialate, Bangalore
 Capuchin Provincialate, Rajajl Nagar
 White Missionaries, Vimalalaya, Bangalore
 Vimalahridaya, Bhairalhi, Bangalore
 St. Norbert Bhavan, Bangalore'
 St. Vincent Pallotti Shrine, Bangalore
 Sacred Heart Brothers, Bangalore
 Icm Sisters. Bangalore
 St. Mary's School, Frosu Town
 JMG Oldage Home, Bangalore
 Sannidhi, MSFS Novitiate, Mysore
 Angaly Ashram, Chamundi Hill, Mysore
 Don Bosco, Sreeramapuram, Mysore
 Old Priest House, gonikoppa, Koorg
 Dominican Sisters Novitiate, Pakshikari, Mangalore
 Dominican Fathers Chapel, Mangalore
 Shrine of Infant Jesus, Mangalore
 Capuchin Provincialate. Kochi
 Punalur Cathedral, Kerala
 Don Bosco Bhavan Chapel – Trichur, Kerala
 Shrine of Mary Help of Christians, Don Bosco School – Irinjalakuda, Kerala
 Christ College Church – Irinjalakuda
 St. George Church – Kalady, Kerala
 Presentation Convent Chapel – Perinthalmanna, Malabar, Kerala
 Menaka Theatre – Ernakulam, Kerala
 Sree Padmanabha Theatre – Trivandrum, Kerala
 Sree Kumar Theatre – Trivandrum, Kerala
 Don Bosco Aspirate, Mannuthy
 Mount Don Bosco, Padivayal, Wayanad
 Grace and Compassion Sisters, Makiyad
 Benedictine Fathers, Makiyad, Wayanad
 Carmelite Spirituality Centre, Peravoor, Calicut
 Diocesan Pastoral Centre, Mananthavady, Kerala
 Don Bosco School Irinjalakuda
 Parish Church Karukuty
 Nazareth Sisters Motherhouse Karukutty
 Parish Church, Kalady
 Don Bosco, Keezhmad, Alwaye
 St. Joseph Parish, Alwaye
 Marello House, Alwaye
 Sacred Heart Fathers, Alwaye
 Ashir Bhavan, Archdiocesan Pastoral Centre, Ernakulam
 Sacred Heart Sisters, Varapuzha
 Lourd Hospital, Cochin
 Our Lady of Perpetual Help Parish Church, Vypeen
 Orthodox St. George Church. Puthuppally, Kotayam
 Old Priest Home, Kollam
 St. Stephen's Church, Thoppe, Kollam
 Novitiate Chapel of Novitiate House, Oblates of St. Joseph, Kulathurpuzha
 Viswa Jyothi – Gurukul Chapel – Varanasi, Uttar Pradesh
 Matredham Ashram – Varanasi
 St. Joseph Gurukul Major Seminary Chapel – Varanasi
 Ims Generalate Chapel – Varanasi
 Infant Jesus Church – Mughal Sarai, U.P.
 Ims Novitiate – Sardhana, Up
 Vidhya Bhavan, Chapel – Kalyani, Calcutta
 Don Bosco Catechetical Centre, Calcutta
 Don Bosco, Calcutta
 Good Shepherd Seminary Chapel – Dimapur, Nagaland
 Don Bosco School Chapel – Tamenglong, Manipur
 Don Bosco School Chapel – Delhi
 Don Bosco, Baroda – Gujarat
 Baroda Cathedral – Baroda
 Rajkot Cathedral – Gujarat
 Casa Pallotti, Panaji, Goa
 Franciscan Missionary Sisters, Goa
 Stella Maris Cathedral, Port Blair, andamans
 Don Bosco, Colombo, Sri Lanka
 Parish Church, Apia, Western Samoa
 Parish Church, Pago Pago, American Samoa
 Bharath Matha Ashram, Kurukshetra – Haryana
 Redemptorist Church, Ambala, Haryana

References
 Divine Designs, Article appeared on The Week, Date : 26 January 1992
 ക്രൈസ്തവ ശില്പ്പ കലയുടെ പ്രവാചകൻ / 1999 August 8 / Deepika Daily

External links
 http://artistvbalan.org

1942 births
2002 deaths
Painters from Kerala
Indian male sculptors
20th-century Indian sculptors
20th-century Indian painters
People from Ernakulam district
Indian male painters
20th-century Indian male artists